While the Attorney Is Asleep is a 1945 Danish crime film directed by Johan Jacobsen and starring Gunnar Lauring.

Cast
Gunnar Lauring as Erik Jessen
Beatrice Bonnesen as Else Jessen
Christian Arhoff as Magnus Stripp
Elith Pio as Robert Jensen
Gerda Neumann as Lilian Berner
Sam Besekow as Takituki
Poul Reichhardt as Charlie
Freddy Albeck as Joe
Gunnar Lemvigh as Mike
Per Gundmann as Sam
Valdemar Skjerning as Mr. Jorgensen
Knud Heglund as Tardini

External links

1945 films
1940s Danish-language films
1945 crime films
Danish black-and-white films
Films directed by Johan Jacobsen
Danish crime films